Olympic High School may refer to:

Olympic High School — Concord, California
Olympic High School — Santa Monica, California
Olympic High School (Charlotte, North Carolina) — Charlotte, North Carolina
Olympic High School (Silverdale, Washington) — Silverdale, Washington
Olympic Vista High School — Chula Vista, California (now called Olympian High School)